San Antonio  is a corregimiento in Atalaya District, Veraguas Province, Panama with a population of 2,966 as of 2010. It was created by Law 58 of July 29, 1998, owing to the Declaration of Unconstitutionality of Law 1 of 1982. Its population as of 2000 was 2,125.

References

Corregimientos of Veraguas Province